Buldir Volcano is an inactive stratovolcano located on Buldir Island in the Aleutian Islands of Alaska, once described as "the westernmost volcanic center of the present Pleistocene to Recent Aleutian volcanic front." It shares the island with a younger stratovolcano entitled East Cape.

Discovery and accessibility 
Vitus Bering had been a prominent sailor in Russia. After successful expeditions in 1725, 1728, and 1730, Bering was sent to explore what is now the Bering Sea area of the Pacific in 1740. He soon settled on Kamchatka, where he started a settlement and built two additional vessels, dubbed St. Peter and St. Paul. In 1741 Bering and his company started towards North America, but were stalled by a storm. In being delayed, they were forced to seek land. During the storm they could not make out the Alaskan coast. The storm proved too powerful so the ships turned around, charting several of the Aleutians, including Buldir Island. The island is extremely remote, leaving it totally unavailable except to only a certain group of scientists. In fact, transportation through the entire area is restricted to the United States Coast Guard. Special permission is required to access the island, and for the most part only representatives from the United States Fish and Wildlife Service have the ability to obtain it. A visit to study the geology of the island was permitted in 1947 for R.R. Coats.

A skeleton was found on the island in July 1988. Further examination of the body suggested that the body was Corporal Carl Houston of Manitowoc, Wisconsin, who was last seen hiking on the isle on March 3, 1945. Along with the body were found a M-1 rifle and several spent shells.

Geography and geology 
The volcano's structure has changed significantly over time, from a parasitic cone to its current makeup of alumina basaltic lava flows and pyroclastic debris. A cone made of tuff tops the mountain, built over the ancient calderas of the volcano. Dating suggests that the last eruptions on the island, from East Cape, were at least 2000 years ago, and could have possibly taken place before the Holocene.

Flora and fauna 
The island supports a limited variety of flora and fauna.  The population of Aleutian cackling geese contributed to a re-expansion of the species, preventing their extinction.

See also

List of mountain peaks of Alaska
List of volcanoes in the United States

References

Bibliography 
Wood, C. A., and Kienle, Juergen, (eds.), 1990, Volcanoes of North America: United States and Canada; New York, Cambridge University Press, 354 p.

External links

Volcanoes of the Aleutian Islands
Landforms of Aleutians West Census Area, Alaska
Volcanoes of Alaska
Stratovolcanoes of the United States
Volcanoes of Unorganized Borough, Alaska
Pleistocene stratovolcanoes